For the American architect, see William Crawford Smith.

Wilbur Cleveland Smith (August 9, 1884 – July 3, 1952) was an American football coach and university administrator.  He served as the head football coach at Wake Forest University from 1914 to 1915, compiling a record of 6–10.  Smith was appointed as the athletic director at Tulane University in 1922.  He was later dean of Louisiana State University Medical School.

Head coaching record

References

1884 births
1952 deaths
Louisiana State University faculty
Tulane Green Wave athletic directors
Wake Forest Demon Deacons football coaches
People from Independence, Kansas